David E. Smith (born 1939) is an American medical doctor from the United States specializing in addiction medicine, the psycho-pharmacology of drugs, new research strategies in the management of drug abuse problems, and proper prescribing practices for physicians. He is the Founder of the Haight Ashbury Free Clinics of San Francisco, a Fellow and Past President of the American Society of Addiction Medicine, Past President of the California Society of Addiction Medicine, Past Medical Director for the California State Department of Alcohol and Drug Programs, Past Medical Director for the California Collaborative Center for Substance Abuse Policy Research, and former adviser to the Betty Ford Center.

Current appointments include: Medical Director for North Bay Recovery Center, a men's dual diagnosis addiction treatment center in northern California. Chair of Addiction Medicine at Muir Wood Adolescent and Family Services in northern, California and medical director for Center Point drug rehabilitation centers. Smith is also an adjunct professor at the University of California, San Francisco. Smith is the Founder and Publisher of the Journal of Psychoactive Drugs.

Career

Haight Ashbury Free Clinics
Smith and Darryl S.Inaba, PharmD founded the Haight Ashbury Free Clinic, which opened in June 1967 on Haight Street in San Francisco to respond to the medical needs of thousands of young people who were coming to the city for the Summer of Love. The Free Clinics still operate today in San Francisco, and continue to serve those without adequate health insurance.

Smith served as medical director of the clinic for 39 years, since its inception. He resigned from the clinic in February 2006 amid legal, medical, and business disputes with the Clinics' administration.

Haight Ashbury Free Clinic Benefit Concerts
The Clinic was initially funded through proceeds of benefit concerts, many of which were organized by Bill Graham (promoter). The first of such benefit concerts took place on July 13, 1967, at the Fillmore Auditorium in San Francisco. Another, titled "Dr. Sunday's Medicine Show", took place on October 8, 1967, in San Jose, California.

These benefit concerts, organized by Smith and Bill Graham in the early years of the Clinic, included bands such as Big Brother and the Holding Company, Creedence Clearwater Revival, Ravi Shankar, George Harrison, The Charlatans, Blue Cheer, and Quicksilver Messenger Service. The concerts proved crucial in providing the funding necessary to keep the Clinic doors open during its early years, as traditional sources of funding were not immediately forthcoming.

Rock Medicine
Through the benefit concerts organized with Bill Graham in the late 1960s and early 1970s, Darryl Inaba and George "Skip" Gay created Rock Medicine with the support of Smith. In the spring of 1973, Bill Graham staged two consecutive Saturday concerts at Kezar Stadium in San Francisco featuring The Grateful Dead and Led Zeppelin. Bill Graham asked the Clinic to staff a "medical emergency care tent" during both concerts. These small stadium concerts, about 18,000 at the Dead and 25,000 at Led Zeppelin, evolved into Bill Graham's Days on the Green concert series. The "medical emergency care tent" became Rock Medicine, which is a branch of the Clinic that still exists today and provides medical care at hundreds of Northern California music concerts and events each year.

Writing career
Smith is the founder and publisher of the Journal of Psychoactive Drugs, which has been published since 1967. Additionally, he is co-author of the textbook Clinician's Guide to Substance Abuse and co-author with Daniel Amen of the book Unchain Your Brain, which provides practical tools for addiction patients and addiction professionals.

Bibliography

 Co-author of the textbook Clinician's Guide to Substance Abuse
 Co-author with Daniel Amen of the book Unchain Your Brain

See also
List of historic rock festivals

References

Sources
Davidson, Leigh. Smith, David E. 'We Built This Clinic on Rock n' Roll'. DrDave.org, 24 March 2007. 16:50 UTC, [accessed 24 March 2007]

External links
David E. Smith's Homepage
Born in the Summer of Love, The Haight Ashbury Free Clinic Transformed Drug Addiction Treatment

American addiction physicians
American medical writers
American psychology writers
Activists from the San Francisco Bay Area
American magazine publishers (people)
American founders
Physicians from California
University of California, San Francisco faculty
University of California, San Francisco alumni
University of California, Berkeley alumni
People from Bakersfield, California
1939 births
Living people